Matías Damián Pérez (born 3 March 1999) is an Argentine professional footballer who plays as a centre-back for Russian club Orenburg.

Professional career
A youth product of his local clubs Florencio Varela and 11 de Agosto, Pérez moved to the youth academy of Lanús at the age of 8. He made his professional debut for Lanús in a 2-0 Argentine Primera División win over Godoy Cruz on 2 February 2020. On 4 March 2022, he extended his professional contract with the club until 2026. He ended a 13-game winless streak for Lanús over Arsenal de Sarandí in August 2022, scoring the only goal in a 1–0 win.

On 21 December 2022, Pérez joined Russian Premier League club Orenburg.

References

External links
 

1999 births
Living people
People from Florencio Varela Partido
Argentine footballers
Association football defenders
Club Atlético Lanús footballers
FC Orenburg players
Argentine Primera División players
Russian Premier League players
Argentine expatriate footballers
Expatriate footballers in Russia
Argentine expatriate sportspeople in Russia